Princess Maria Immaculata of Bourbon-Two Sicilies may refer to:

 Princess Maria Immaculata of Bourbon-Two Sicilies (1844–1899), daughter of Ferdinand II of the Two Sicilies and Maria Theresa of Austria
 Princess Maria Immaculata of Bourbon-Two Sicilies (1874–1947), daughter of Prince Alfonso, Count of Caserta and Princess Antonietta of Bourbon-Two Sicilies

See also:
Princess Maria Immacolata of Bourbon-Two Sicilies